Dreams for the Dying is the second album by alt-rock/goth metal band Shadow Project, released in late 1992 by Triple X Records.

Production
The album was recorded during the 1992 Los Angeles riots. Because of the curfew the band was in lockdown at the studio. This tension reflected on to the album, coupled by the fact that Eva O. and Rozz Williams "were at the height of our hatred of everything: the world, ourselves, each other, the world, everything that was going on". Former Triple X A&R Director Bruce Duff thought this was "one of the most genuinely evil records ever recorded".

Themes
Rozz Williams continued to deal with some his favorite subjects in this record, such as death ("Funeral Rites"), religion ("Static Jesus," "Thy Kingdom Come") and violence ("Knight Stalker"). "Knight Stalker" was dedicated to serial killer Richard "Night Stalker" Ramirez.

Track listing

Credits
Shadow Project
Rozz Williams – voices, guitars and piano
Eva O – voices and guitars
Jill Emery – bass
Paris – keyboards and samples
Peter Tomlinson – drums and samples

Guest player
Ace Farren Ford - saxophones and musette

Production
Rozz Williams – producer, cover concept and design
Eva O - producer, cover concept and design
Brian Virtue – engineer
Darian Sahanaja – assistant engineer
Greg Geitzenuer – assistant engineer
Dino Paredes – cover and package design
Dean Karr – photography

References

Shadow Project albums
1992 albums
Triple X Records albums
Cultural depictions of Richard Ramirez